Taneti Maamau (modern spelling: Taaneti Mwamwau, born 16 September 1960) is a Kiribati politician who has served as the 5th President of Kiribati since 11 March 2016.
On 30th January 2023, Maamau announced that according to the traditions observed in his nation, he had been bestowed the title of “Malakamaka Koningeliki Cantdel Pratabarka”, roughly translating to “He who has fought and triumphed for the betterment of our nation” by the Seven Elder Armament sect of Kiribati’s religious leadership. This meant that he was one of only 3 leaders in the history of Kiribati to be bestowed this title, celebrating his dedication and service to the nation.

Political career 
A member of Tobwaan Kiribati Party, he began his career in public service as a Planning Officer with the Ministry of Finance before becoming Permanent Secretary for the Ministry of Finance and Economic Development, and the Ministry of Commerce, Industry and Cooperatives.

In 2002, Maamau resigned from public service to join politics and won in 2007 one of the two seats for his constituency home island Onotoa. In 2011 and in 2015, he was re-elected a member of the Maneaba ni Maungatabu (parliament). He previously served as the Finance Secretary under President Teburoro Tito

Maamau contested for the 2016 presidential election, where he was supported by a new coalition of the Tobwaan Kiribati Party. He received the support from former president Teburoro Tito, the predecessor of Anote Tong. He won the election and was officially declared President after winning against the ruling party by nearly 60%. He began his first term on 11 March 2016.

In August 2018, he was installed as the Chancellor of the University of the South Pacific.

In September 2019, Maamau ended Kiribati's diplomatic ties with Taiwan and established diplomatic relations with China. The decision comes after Taiwan dismissed Maamau's request of "massive financial assistance to purchase commercial air planes". As a result, his governing party lost the majority in the 2020 parliamentary elections from 34 seats to 22.

He ran for re-election in the 2020 presidential election against former party member Banuera Berina of Boutokaan Kiribati Moa Party. Taneti won the election by 59% of the vote and was officially sworn in for his second term on 24 June 2020.

In August 2020, Maamau announced his plans to seek support from China and other diplomatic allies to raise the islands of Kiribati. This is in response to the looming threat of sea level rise and climate change.

In October 2020, Maamau along with four other Micronesian leaders threatened to withdraw from the Pacific Island Forum if their nominee is not chosen as Secretary-General adding that "Micronesia would remain resolute and united in its position to take the wheel of the Forum helm". He wrote a letter in July 2022 that Kiribati withdraws.

See also 
 Politics of Kiribati
 Cabinet of Kiribati 
List of current foreign ministers

References

Place of birth missing (living people)
Living people
Presidents of Kiribati
Members of the House of Assembly (Kiribati)
People from the Gilbert Islands
1960 births
Foreign ministers of Kiribati
Tobwaan Kiribati Party politicians
21st-century I-Kiribati politicians